Brooks & Dunn is an American country music duo composed of Kix Brooks and Ronnie Dunn. Signed to Arista Nashville, Brooks & Dunn has released 12 studio albums and seven compilation albums for the label. The duo has also charted 51 singles on the Billboard country charts, including 20 Number One hits. Two of their Number Ones have been declared by Billboard as the country single of the year: a cover of B.W. Stevenson's "My Maria" in 1996, and "Ain't Nothing 'bout You" (which is also their longest-lasting Number One, at six weeks) in 2001.

Studio albums

1990s

2000s and 2010s

Compilation albums

Extended plays

Singles

1990s

2000s and 2010s

As a featured artist

Other charted songs

Music videos

Notes

References

Country music discographies
Discographies of American artists